Geranium robertianum, commonly known as herb-Robert, or (in North America) Roberts geranium, is a common species of cranesbill native to Europe and parts of Asia, and North Africa. The plant has  many vernacular names, including red robin, death come quickly, fox geranium, stinking Bob, squinter-pip (Shropshire) and crow's foot.

Description
It grows as a procumbent (prostrate or trailing) to erect annual or biennial plant, up to fifty centimetres high, producing small, pink, five-petalled flowers (8–14 mm in diameter) from April until the autumn. The leaves are deeply dissected, ternate to palmate, the stems reddish and prominently hairy; the leaves also turn red at the end of the flowering season.

Distribution
Its main area of distribution is Europe from the north Mediterranean coast to the Baltic and from the British Isles in the west to the Caucasus in the east, and eastern North America.  In western North America, it has escaped from cultivation and is regarded as an invasive species.
Geranium robertianum is common throughout Great Britain and Ireland in woodland, hedgerows, scree and maritime shingle.

Uses
Herb Robert has been used in the folk medicine of several countries, including as a treatment for diarrhea, to improve functioning of the liver and gallbladder, for toothache and nosebleeds, and as a vulnerary (used for or useful in healing wounds). Its common name has several possible sources: the Latin word for red, ruber; Shakespearean character Robin Goodfellow, the mischievous hobgoblin in A Midsummer Night's Dream; an early duke of Normandy named Robert who is rumored to have commissioned the Regimen sanitatis Salernitanum; or abbot and herbalist Robert of Molesme.  Freshly picked leaves have an odor resembling burning tires when crushed, and if they are rubbed on the body the smell is said to repel mosquitoes.

The active ingredients are tannins, a bitter compound called geraniin, and essential oils.

References

Bibliography

External links

Images at Bioimages (UK)
Species treatment from the Jepson Manual
Entry in the Plants for a Future database

robertianum
Flora of Western Asia
Flora of North Africa
Flora of Palestine (region)
Medicinal plants of Africa
Medicinal plants of Asia
Medicinal plants of Europe
Garden plants of Europe
Plants described in 1753
Taxa named by Carl Linnaeus
Flora of Saint Pierre and Miquelon